Dávid Skokan (born 6 December 1988) is a Slovak professional ice hockey centre who currently plays with HK Poprad of the Slovak Extraliga.

Playing career
Skokan made his professional debut with HK Poprad in the Slovak Extraliga during the 2004–05 season. With early aspirations to pursue an NHL career, Skokan moved to North America to play major junior hockey with Rimouski Oceanic of the Quebec Major Junior Hockey League. After his second season in the QMJHL, he was selected by the New York Rangers in the 7th round (193rd overall) of the 2007 NHL Entry Draft.

He was however unable to sign a contract with the Rangers and instead he returned to HK Poprad in 2008 before signing with HC Slovan Bratislava the next season. After three season, he returned to Poprad once more before moving onto the Czech Extraliga to play with HC Slavia Praha and later HK Hradec Králové.

In 2015, Skokan returned to Slovan Bratislava, who were this time playing in the Kontinental Hockey League. He also had a brief loan spell at ŠKP Poprad, marking his fourth spell with the club. After just one season in the KHL, Skokan returned to the Czech Extraliga and signed for Piráti Chomutov.

Career statistics

Regular season and playoffs
Bold indicates led league

International

Awards and honours

References

External links

1988 births
Living people
HC Dynamo Pardubice players
Löwen Frankfurt players
New York Rangers draft picks
Piráti Chomutov players
Rimouski Océanic players
HC Slavia Praha players
HC Slovan Bratislava players
HK Poprad players
HC Košice players
Sportspeople from Poprad
Stadion Hradec Králové players
Slovak ice hockey centres
Slovak expatriate ice hockey players in Germany
Slovak expatriate ice hockey players in the Czech Republic